Patty López is a Mexican-American politician and former member of the California State Assembly, representing the 39th district, encompassing parts of the San Fernando Valley. She is a Democrat. Prior to being elected to the Assembly, she was a community representative for the North Valley Occupational Center-Aviation Center. After serving in the Assembly, she ran for a seat on the Los Angeles Unified School District Board of Education, but did not make the run-off election.

Personal life
She arrived in the United States at the age of 12 from Michoacán, Mexico, speaking no English.  Her parents did not enroll her in public school.  Ultimately, she taught herself how to read and write in English and re-enrolled in adult night school at the age of 18 in order to earn her high school diploma.  Having worked since the age of 14, she held various jobs as a housekeeper, children's nanny, fast food worker, factory worker, and educational advocate.  Her experience of having to seek out education as an adult instilled a lifelong interest in public education for her.  She helped found the Padres Activos of the San Fernando Valley, an organization dedicated to helping immigrant parents secure their children's academic rights in public school.

Career

2014 California State Assembly 

In 2014, she ran for office for the first time and was elected to the California State Assembly, narrowly defeating the incumbent in an upset. She was immediately accused of numerous serious campaign finance violations by her opponents, including money laundering, purposefully hiding donors, and secretly arranging independent expenditures to benefit her.  She was subjected to an over year long investigation by the California Fair Political Practices Commission.  The Commission ultimately exonerated her of all serious charges although they found some minor infractions in record-keeping and she was fined accordingly.  Her most serious campaign finance law violation was her failure to properly deposit approximately $800 in campaign funds raised from selling homemade pupusas and tamales on the side of a freeway off-ramp into her campaign bank account first before spending it on campaign t-shirts for her volunteers.

Since joining the Assembly, Patty López has authored several pieces of legislation that have been successfully enacted into law.  Her most important piece of legislation was the Right to Dry bill, which prohibits apartment complexes and multiple family residential dwellings from banning individuals who wish to dry their clothing on a clothes line. She also authored legislation to require an independent film maker to sit as a board member on California's Filming Commission. In 2016, she was honored by the National Women's Political Caucus as the recipient of their annual Leadership award.  She was also given the annual Green Leadership Award in 2016.  She notably authored a bill to make prosecutorial misconduct a felony offense.  Although she was accused of being a secret Republican, Patty López earned a perfect score from the Courage Campaign in their review of her 2015 voting record.  She also has led activist rallies in her community in defense of the rights of undocumented immigrants and the rights of transgender individuals.

Patty López has also been known to occasionally give remarks on the State Assembly floor in Spanish, which is her first language.  She was one of five Democrats in the State Assembly to vote against the mandatory vaccination bill, SB 277.  Additionally, she was a strong proponent of the minimum wage increase to $15 an hour in California, reflecting on the Assembly floor about her own experience as a minimum wage earner.

2016 California State Assembly 

She ran for reelection in 2016 and was successful in once again making the top two runoff in June 2016.

López had the endorsement of the California League of Conservation Voters, SEIU United Healthcare Workers West, the California Teachers Association, SEIU State Service Employees Council, SEIU Local 2015, SEIU Local 99, United Teachers of Los Angeles, the California Nurses Association, Consumer Attorneys of California, the Sierra Club, the National Women's Political Caucus, Democrats for Israel, the Faculty Association of California Community Colleges, the Chicano Latino Immigrant Democratic Club of Los Angeles, the Alliance of Californians for Community Empowerment, the California Democratic Legislative Women’s Caucus, and the California Legislative Latino Caucus.  She also earned the endorsement of the Los Angeles Daily News.

2017 Los Angeles Unified School District Board of Education 
A week after losing her Assembly seat, the Los Angeles Times reported that López had filed papers to run for an open seat representing Los Angeles Unified School District 6 after incumbent Mónica Ratliff vacated the seat to run for Los Angeles City Council District 7. While López did not report any campaign financing or expenditures, relying on donated signs and volunteers, the California Charter School Association Advocates Independent Expenditure Committee reported spending $89,255.57 in mailings opposing her candidacy, claiming that during her Assembly tenure she voted "with conservatives in Sacramento." López lost the election by finishing in third place behind Kelly Gonez and Imelda Padilla.

References

External links 
 Campaign website
 Join California - Patty Lopez

Democratic Party members of the California State Assembly
Living people
American people of Mexican descent
American politicians of Mexican descent
Hispanic and Latino American state legislators in California
Hispanic and Latino American women in politics
Mexican emigrants to the United States
1968 births
21st-century American women politicians